Fan Ho (8 October 1931 – 19 June 2016) was a Chinese photographer, film director, and actor. From 1956, he won over 280 awards from international exhibitions and competitions worldwide for his photography.

Photography career
Fan Ho was born in Shanghai in 1931, and emigrated with his family to Hong Kong in 1949. At the outbreak of war in 1941, Ho's parents were stranded in Macau for several years and Ho was left in the care of a family servant. Ho began photographing at a very young age with a Brownie which his father had left at home, and later with a Rolleiflex twin-lens reflex camera his father gave him at the age of 14. Largely self-taught, his photos display a fascination with urban life, explored alleys, slums, markets and streets. Much of his work consists of candid photographs of the street vendors and children only a few years younger than himself. He developed his images in the family bathtub and soon had built up a significant body of work, chronicling Hong Kong in the 1950s and 1960s as it was becoming a major metropolitan centre. Ho would use the same Rolleiflex K4A throughout his career.

Upon seeing Ho's work for the first time in 2006, gallery owner Laurence Miller commented that "[they] felt like direct descendants of the Bauhaus, yet they were made in Hong Kong. They were abstract and humanistic at the same time."

Ho was a Fellow of the Photographic Society of America, the Royal Photographic Society and the Royal Society of Arts in England, and an Honorary Member of the Photographic Societies of Singapore, Argentina, Brazil, Germany, France, Italy and Belgium. Ho was named one of the "Top Ten Photographers of the World" by the Photographic Society of America between 1958 and 1965.

"Approaching Shadow", 1954 《陰影》

"Approaching Shadow" was one of Ho's most famous works. He asked a cousin to pose by a wall at Queen's College in Causeway Bay and added a diagonal shadow in the darkroom to symbolize that "her youth will fade away" since "everyone has the same destiny". A print of "Approaching Shadow" sold for a record  in 2015.

Film career
Ho was a Hong Kong film director and actor.

He joined Shaw Brothers in 1961 to develop his career in cinema. He started as a continuity assistant in the movie The Swallow (1961) and moved on to act in several movies for Shaw. Ho played the Monk, Tripitaka, in the lavish Shaw Brothers adaption of Journey to the West four-picture cycle of films. Ho became disillusioned with Shaw's revenue-driven formula, and sought creative relief in photography and in other studios.

During the early 1960s he also produced a series of independent short films, the first of which, Big City Little Man (大都市 小人物; 1963, 30 min), won the "Honor Award Certificate" from the Japan International Film Festival in 1964.

Ho left Shaw Brothers in 1969 to develop his career as a director, making over 20 films with various studios in Hong Kong and Taiwan. He has had three films in the "Official Selection" of the International Film Festivals of Cannes, Berlin and San Francisco; and five of his films have been selected in the "Permanent Collection" of the National Film Archives of Taiwan and Hong Kong. As well as his independent film work he worked in erotic cinema (Category III films), with such films as Adventure in Denmark (1973), The Girl with the Long Hair (1975) and Temptation Summary (1990).

According to Mark Pinsukanjana, director of Modernbook Gallery in San Francisco, CA, his debut feature, Lost (1969), was Ho's favourite. As Pinsukanjana says:

In Lost, one will see the chaotic life of one man in Hong Kong. The film follows him and finds the beauty that surrounds him; he is lost because he never saw it. I think that one can say that this is similar to Fan Ho's photographs in the sense that Hong Kong is crowded, busy and chaotic to many, but for Fan Ho, he was able to convert [what he found] and find beauty."

He also served on the jury of the Golden Horse Film Festival and Awards Festival and Hong Kong Film Award.

Post-retirement career

Ho's wife and children emigrated to San Jose, California in 1979 to pursue a university education and he followed in 1995 after retiring from cinema. Restless in retirement, Ho's health began to decline until his family suggested that he pursue photography again. Rather than using modern equipment and taking photographs locally in the San Francisco Bay Area, Ho went through his old negatives from Hong Kong and began showing his portfolio to local galleries.

He exhibited slides of his photographs, some of which were in the permanent collection at SFMOMA, at the 1998 New Asian Cinema Festival, which was screening his 1988 film Carnal Desire at the 4 Star Theater in San Francisco. A chance meeting with Mark Pinsukanjana in 1999 led to Ho being featured at Pinsukanjana's Modernbook Gallery in Palo Alto in 2000, his first solo exhibition since the 1960s, and in 2001, and Ho's films and photographs continued to be shown at festivals hosted at the 4 Star. Ho's daughter credits the first Palo Alto exhibition in 2000 with restoring Ho's confidence and happiness.

Modernbook went on to stage his vintage work at photoLA in January 2006, and upon seeing his photographs of Hong Kong, fellow gallery owner Laurence Miller was moved to acquire 26 prints and put on a solo exhibit for Ho in New York City later that year. Ho would go on to publish a new monograph, Hong Kong Yesterday in 2006 after receiving international attention for this early work. By compositing old negatives, Ho continued to produce new prints of scenes that have now vanished from modern Hong Kong. Many of the resulting composited prints were published for the first time in his final monograph A Hong Kong Memoir in 2014, following exhibits of the same title at Modernbook in summer 2011 and from December 2014 to January 2015.

He died in San Jose on 19 June 2016 of pneumonia at the age of 84. Posthumously, thirty-two photographs taken in 1950s Hong Kong as well as related objects, including his Rolleiflex camera and an early book, Thoughts on Street Photography, were exhibited at Sotheby's Hong Kong gallery in the last half of June 2017. A new monograph, Portrait of Hong Kong, was published in June 2017 to coincide with the exhibition.

Portrait of Hong Kong 《念香港人的舊》 contains 153 new street photographs which were selected from 500 negatives chosen by Ho before he died in 2016. After his death, the surviving family members spent about a year completing the project, together with support from Sarah Greene (Blue Lotus Consultancy) and WE Press (香港人出版). 20 quotable excerpts from Ho's earliest book, Thoughts on Street Photography 《街頭攝影叢談》, were included. These 153 photographs provide not only glimpses of Hong Kong in the 1950s and 1960s but also recall the indomitable spirit of the people at the time This body of realistic street photographs were never highly recognized during 1950s and 1960s, despite being Ho's favorites, as quoted in Ho's reply to Sarah Greene during one of her visits to Ho in early 2016. The quote appeared in the afterword of his latest monograph:

Ho's family also established a website to celebrate his life and work.

Works by Ho

Short films
Big City Little Man /  (1963, 30 min, Hong Kong)
Home Work /  (1966, 40 min, Hong Kong)
Gulf / 離 : (1966 Banbury England Best Film Award, 15 min, Hong Kong)

Feature films

Monographs

See also
 Ray Metzker
 László Moholy-Nagy

Notes

References

External links
Biography at Hong Kong Cinemagic

Online exhibitions
1950s Hong Kong Captured In Street Photography By Fan Ho

Documentary videos
 
 

1931 births
2016 deaths
Arts in China
Chinese photographers
Street photographers
Hong Kong photographers
Film directors from Shanghai
Hong Kong male film actors
Hong Kong film directors
Male actors from Shanghai
Chinese male film actors
Hong Kong artists